Frederic Jesup Stimson (July 20, 1855 – November 19, 1943) was an American writer and lawyer, who served as the United States Ambassador to Argentina from 1915 to 1921. He was the first U.S. envoy to Argentina to hold the title "Ambassador", the previous envoys having held the title "Envoy Extraordinary and Minister Plenipotentiary".

Biography
Frederic Jesup Stimson was born in Dedham, Massachusetts on July 20, 1855. He later purchashed the home built by Fisher Ames.

He was a Harvard Law graduate and writer of several influential books on law, and also a novelist specializing in historical romances, sometimes writing under the pen name "J.S. of Dale".

He died at his home in Dedham on November 19, 1943. He is buried in lot EI3 at the Old Village Cemetery.

Notes

References

External links

 
 J. S., of Dale at LC Authorities, with 6 records, and at WorldCat
 
 
 
 
 Letters written to Frederic Stimson at Harvard University

1855 births
1943 deaths
Ambassadors of the United States to Argentina
The Harvard Lampoon alumni
Harvard Law School alumni
Writers from Dedham, Massachusetts
Diplomats from Dedham, Massachusetts
20th-century American diplomats
Members of the American Academy of Arts and Letters